The Four Mile Dam Formation, also called the Four Mile Dam Limestone, is a geologic formation in Michigan. It preserves fossils dating back to the middle Devonian period.

Fossil content

Vertebrates

Acanthodians

Conodonts

Placoderms

Invertebrates

Brachiopods

Corals

Gastropods

Sponges

Trilobites

See also

 List of fossiliferous stratigraphic units in Michigan

References

 

Devonian Michigan
Devonian southern paleotemperate deposits